The governor of Madhya Pradesh is a nominal head and representative of the president of India in the state of Madhya Pradesh. The governor is appointed by the president for a period of five years.

Governors of Madhya Pradesh

See also
 Madhya Pradesh
 Chief Minister of Madhya Pradesh
 Governors of India

References

External links

Madhya Pradesh
 
Governors